The discography of the Japanese heavy metal band X Japan consists of five studio albums, six live albums, one remix album, eleven compilations, one soundtrack album, 23 singles, and around 22 live video recordings.

Founded in 1982 by vocalist Toshi and drummer Yoshiki, X Japan started out as a power/speed metal band and later gravitated towards a progressive sound with an emphasis on ballads.  With the member line-up including bassist Taiji and guitarists hide and Pata since 1987, X released their debut studio album Vanishing Vision on Yoshiki's own record label Extasy Records the following year. They then achieved breakthrough success with their second album and major label debut, Blue Blood, in 1989. It was followed by the million-selling Jealousy (1991), which is the band's most diverse album in terms of songwriting credits. In 1992, the band changed their name to X Japan and bassist Taiji left the group, being replaced by Heath. The mini-album Art of Life was released in 1993, composed solely of the 29-minute title track. Their last album Dahlia was released in 1996, and the following year the band decided to break up. However, after ten years, X Japan reunited in 2007 and recorded the new song "I.V.". They officially recruited lead guitarist Sugizo to fill-in for the deceased hide two years later and in 2011 had their first worldwide release, the digital single "Jade". Shortly after reuniting, work began on their sixth studio album. During its ten years of production, several release dates were announced, but it remains unreleased despite being completed in September 2018.

Besides being one of the first Japanese acts to achieve mainstream success while on an independent label, the band is widely credited as one of the pioneers of visual kei, a movement among Japanese musicians comparable to Western glam. X Japan have sold millions of records in Japan, claiming un-certified sales of over 30 million.

Albums

Studio albums

Live albums

Compilation albums

Remix albums

Soundtrack albums

Singles

Notes 
1.The numbers are purely based on RIAJ certifications

Various artists compilations

VHS / LD / DVD / Blu-ray

Demos

Unreleased songs
 "Angel"
Performed for the first time at the Yokohama Arena show on 2015.
 "Feel Me Tonight"
Lyrics by Yoshiki, music by Hally.
 "Install"
Also known as "Feels Damage".
 "Kill the Violence"
 "Kiss the Sky"
Planned to be included on the band's unreleased album.
 "L'arme"
Left-over from the Jealousy album. Part of the song was performed in 2015.
 "Only Way"
Lyrics by Jun and Toshi, music by Jun.
 "Right Now"
Written by Jun.
 "Rockstar"
Planned to be included on the band's unreleased album.
 "Steal Your Heart"
 "Tuneup Baby"
Written by Jun.
 "White Poem II"
Sequel to "White Poem I" from the Dahlia album.

Other
 Gekitotsu!! – Color, January 1988
X appear as guests.
 Tokyo Pop, April 15, 1988
X makes a brief cameo appearance.
 "Kurenai (Original Japanese Version)", June 1988, Extasy
A flexi disc included in an issue of Rockin' f magazine. Contrary to the title the lyrics are mostly in English. This version does not appear anywhere else.
 Bosutsu! VOS No.9, November 5, 1988
VHS that came with a magazine. Live clips of X from September 4, 1988 are shown and Yoshiki is interviewed.
 Symphonic Blue Blood, August 21, 1991
Symphonic album, performed by the Tokyo Academic Chamber Orchestra.
 Unrivaled is Extasy ~ Extasy Summit '91 at Nippon Budokan, February 21, 1992, Extasy
Live recordings of a 1991 Extasy Summit, held by Extasy Records. Also features Tokyo Yankees, Virus, Luna Sea and several others.
 Symphonic Silent Jealousy, August 26, 1992
Symphonic album, performed by the Tokyo Academic Chamber Orchestra.
 Orchestra Selection - Blue Blood & Jealousy, November 21,1992
Symphonic album, performed by the Royal Philharmonic Orchestra.
 Minna ga Mumei-Datta, Dakedo... Muteki-Datta ~ Extasy Summit 1992, May 10, 1993, Extasy
Live recordings of the October 31, 1992 Extasy Summit, held by Extasy Records. X does not perform together, but the members do perform with other acts. Also features Luna Sea, Deep, Media Youth, The Zolge, Tokyo Yankees, Screaming Mad George and Psychosis, Gilles de Rais, Zi:Kill and several others.
 X Japan Virtual Shock 001, October 20, 1995, Sega
Video game for the Sega Saturn home console. The player takes the role of a fan disguised as a photographer backstage at X Japan's December 31, 1994 concert at the Tokyo Dome (Shiroi Yoru). After collecting several items to gain access and photograph the band members, the player edits a live video of "Rusty Nail" and the game ends with footage from the concert.
 X Japan on Piano, May 25, 1998
Symphonic album, performed by an ensemble of several recognized classical musicians.
 Rose & Blood -Indies of X-, May 2, 2001
Unofficial compilation album featuring demos from the Jealousy album sessions. The band is credited as "iX".
 Global Metal, June 20, 2008
Various live clips of X are shown and Yoshiki is interviewed.
 We Are X, January 23, 2016
Documentary about X Japan and Yoshiki.

References

External links
 X Japan discography at Discogs
 X Japan discography on iTunes

Discography
Discographies of Japanese artists
Heavy metal group discographies